The Horse in the Gray Flannel Suit is a 1968 American comedy film directed by Norman Tokar, with a screenplay by Louis Pelletier and starring Dean Jones, Diane Baker, Ellen Janov, Kurt Russell, Lurene Tuttle and Fred Clark in his final film role. It is based on the 1965 book The Year of the Horse by Eric Hatch. The film's title is a humorous reference to the titular horse's color and the title of the 1955 Sloan Wilson novel (and 1956 film) about the American search for purpose in a world dominated by business, The Man in the Gray Flannel Suit.

The film was paired with the animated featurette Winnie the Pooh and the Blustery Day in its original theatrical release but failed at the box office, and it received mostly negative reviews for its predictable script.

Plot
Madison Avenue advertising executive Fred Bolton, a Lakeville, Connecticut widower living beyond his means, is beset by two major problems. His boss has instructed him to devise an original campaign in just 24 hours to promote their client Allied Drug & Food's over-the-counter indigestion medication, Aspercel. Allied's chairman Tom Dugan wants a "jet set" appeal campaign that will "give sour stomachs class and dignity."

Fred's other problem is his teenage daughter Helen, who loves horses, takes riding classes and has competed. She dreams of having her own horse but knows that the family cannot afford one and that her father is allergic to horses.

Fred has an idea to solve both problems at once: he will acquire a good horse, name it Aspercel and publicize the horse while Helen rides it. Helen and the horse must first win a few prizes to make the horse a celebrated figure. Fred enlists the help of Helen's riding instructor Suzie, and is assisted by teenager Ronny Gardner, who is smitten with Helen.

Helen wins some ribbons, but the resulting publicity is below Dugan's expectations. When Helen learns that her father's job is at stake, she falters under pressure and fails to win an important show. Suzie realizes Aspercel's potential when the horse carries Fred over a wall and away from a police car. She volunteers to ride Aspercel in the International Horse Show and recruits her wealthy friend and equestrian Archer Madison as a trainer. After a close competition with the reigning champion, Suzie and Aspercel win the championship. Fred is rewarded with a promotion and Suzie's love.

Cast

See also
List of American films of 1968

References

External links
  
 
 
 

Films about horses
1968 films
American comedy films
Walt Disney Pictures films
Films directed by Norman Tokar
1968 comedy films
Films set in Connecticut
Films scored by George Bruns
1960s English-language films
Films produced by Winston Hibler
1960s American films